This is a list of Turkish Navy amphibious warfare vessels that have served past and present, from 10 July 1920 to present.

Tank landing ships

Ex-US LST class 

Bayraktar class tank landing ship (Ex-Bundesmarine of West Germany, Ex- US Navy :

Ex-US Terrebonne Parish class

Ertuğrul class tank landing ship (Ex- US Navy Terrebonne Parish class tank landing ship):

Çakabey

Sarucabey class 

Sarucabey class tank landing ship:

Osmangazi class 

Osmangazi class tank landing ship:

Tank landing craft

Ex-British LCT Mk IV type 
Ex-British LCT Mk IV type:

Ex-French EDIC type
Ç-107 - Ç-138

Ex-US LCU-501 class 
Ex-US LCU-501 class

LCU type 
Ç-205 - Ç-216

Ex-US LCM-8 type 
Ex- US Navy LCM-8:

Ç-139 class 
Ç-139 class - (currently categorized by the Turkish Navy as Ç-117 class)

Sources

External links 
 Serhat Guvenc, "Building a Republican Navy in Turkey: 1924-1939", International Journal of Naval History
 Unofficial Homepage of Turkish Navy

Turkish Navy
Amphibious warfare vessels of the Turkish Navy
Amphibious warfare vessels
Lists of ships of Turkey